Out of Sight is a 1996 crime fiction novel by Elmore Leonard.

Plot
Jack Foley, a "gentleman bank robber," arranges a break-out from a Florida jail. The plan is interrupted by shotgun toting Federal Marshal Karen Sisco. The pair end up in the trunk of the getaway car, where they find they have a mutual interest: classic Hollywood movies.

Movie adaptation
The novel was adapted to a 1998 movie of the same name directed by Steven Soderbergh, starring George Clooney as Foley and Jennifer Lopez as Sisco. In 2003-04, an ABC-TV series followed, Karen Sisco, starring Carla Gugino as Sisco.

Foley's character returned in Leonard's 2009 novel, Road Dogs.

References

1996 American novels
American crime novels
Novels by Elmore Leonard
American novels adapted into films
United States Marshals Service in fiction
Novels set in Detroit
Novels set in Miami